Potii-ta-rire is the goddess of magic in Tahitian mythology.

References 
 Robert D. Craig: Dictionary of Polynesian Mythology, 1989

Tahiti and Society Islands goddesses
Magic goddesses